Richard L. Larkin (born February 28, 1952) is an American politician in the state of Iowa.

Larkin was born in Ottumwa, Iowa and worked as a correctional counselor. A Democrat, he served in the Iowa House of Representatives from 1993 to 2003 (99th district).

References

1952 births
Living people
People from Ottumwa, Iowa
Indian Hills Community College alumni
Democratic Party members of the Iowa House of Representatives